Mark Conway (born 31 January 1964) is an English former professional rugby league footballer who played in the 1980s and 1990s. As of 2017, he still holds Wakefield Trinity's 'most goals in a match' record with 13-goals scored in the 90–12 victory over Highfield during the 1992–93 Regal Trophy preliminary round during the 1992–93 season at Belle Vue, Wakefield, on Tuesday 27 October 1992.

Playing career

County Cup Final appearances
Mark Conway played  in Wakefield Trinity's 8–11 defeat by Castleford in the 1990–91 Yorkshire Cup Final during the 1990–91 season at Elland Road, Leeds on Sunday 23 September 1990.

Notable tour matches
Mark Conway played , and scored two goals in Leeds' 4–31 defeat by Australia in the 1982 Kangaroo tour of Great Britain and France match at Headingley, Leeds on Wednesday 20 October 1982, played  in the 10–16 defeat by New Zealand in the 1985 New Zealand rugby league tour of Great Britain and France match at Headingley, Leeds on Tuesday 29 October 1985, and played , and scored 3-goals in Wakefield Trinity's 18–36 defeat by Australia in the 1990 Kangaroo tour of Great Britain and France match at Belle Vue Wakefield on Wednesday 10 October 1990.

Club career
Mark Conway played , and he made his début in Leeds' victory over Bramley in the Lazenby Cup at Headingley in 1981, that was to be his only appearance in the starting line-up during the 1981–82 season as the understudy to Kevin Dick, Conway spent five seasons with Leeds competing with Kevin Dick and Cliff Lyons for the  position, and he produced a number of memorable performances in cup ties.

In August 1987, the Leeds players; Mark Conway, Phil ip Fox, Andy Mason and Keith Rayne, were transferred in exchange for the Wakefield Trinity players; John Lyons, and Gary Spencer.

Mark Conway is sixth on the all-time Wakefield Trinity goal kicking list, and fourth on the all-time Wakefield Trinity points scoring list.

Outside of Rugby League
Mark was a pupil at Newton Hill Junior School, and Outwood Grange School, and is a former coach at Stanley Rangers ARLFC, and as of 2017 he is a franchise sales director at 9ROUND Fitness UK. He has a daughter Danielle, (born ), and a son Matt, (born ).

References

External links
 (archived by web.archive.org) Wakefield Trinity V Australia 1990
 (archived by archive.is) Wakefield Trinity V Australia 1990
 (archived by webcitation.org) www.webcitation.org → query
Kelly recalls where it all started as World Cup looms
Rooney record as Wakefield run riot
Stanley Rangers ARLFC - Roll of Honour
(archived by web.archive.org) Leeds V New Zealand 29 October 1985
Video of goal 1:55 -to- 2:15

1964 births
Living people
Dewsbury Rams players
Doncaster R.L.F.C. players
English rugby league players
Leeds Rhinos players
Rugby league five-eighths
Rugby league halfbacks
Rugby league players from Wakefield
Wakefield Trinity captains
Wakefield Trinity players